Ralph Louis Wain CBE FRS (29 May 1911 Hyde, Cheshire – 14 December 2000 Canterbury) was a British agricultural chemist.

He read Chemistry at the University of Sheffield on scholarship, and with first class honours degree, and a Master of Science and PhD. He was advised by G.M. Bennett.

He lectured in chemistry at the South Eastern Agricultural College at Wye, until 1939.
During World War II, he conducted research at Long Ashton Research Station, at the University of Bristol. After the war, he was Head of the Chemistry Department and the Chair of Agricultural Chemistry at Wye College.

He was Honorary Director of the Unit on Plant Growth Substances and Selective Fungicides at Wye.
He lectured at University of Kent at Canterbury where he was Honorary Professor in 1977.

He was married and had two children.

Awards
1988 Mullard Medal, Royal Society
1977 Actonian Award of the Royal Institution of Great Britain
1960 Research Medal of the Royal Agricultural Society
1963 John Scott International Award

Works
"Chemotherapy for plant diseases", The New Scientist, January 7, 1960, Vol. 7, No. 164,

References

British chemists
Fellows of the Royal Society
1911 births
2000 deaths
Alumni of Sheffield Hallam University
Academics of Wye College
Academics of the University of Kent
People from Tameside (district)